"Not My Soul" is a song by Maltese singer Destiny Chukunyere. It represented Malta and was the winning song at the Junior Eurovision Song Contest 2015 in Sofia, Bulgaria.

Music video
The music video was released on 26 October 2015. It features Chukunyere performing the song amongst colourful backdrops.

References

External links
 Eurovision.tv

Junior Eurovision Song Contest winning songs
2015 singles
2015 songs
Destiny Chukunyere songs